Järva County ( or Järvamaa;) is one of 15 counties of Estonia. It is situated in the central part of the country and borders Lääne-Viru County to the east, Jõgeva County to the south-east, Viljandi County to the south, Pärnu County to the south-west, Rapla County to the west, and Harju County to the north. In January 2009, Järva County had a population of 29,940  – constituting 2.7% of the total population in Estonia.

History
In the first centuries AD political and administrative subdivisions began to emerge. Two larger subdivisions appeared: the parish (kihelkond) and the county (maakond). The parish consisted of several villages. Nearly all parishes had at least one fortress. The defense of the local area was directed by the highest official, the parish elder. The county was composed of several parishes, also headed by an elder. By the 13th century the following major districts had developed in Estonia: Saaremaa (Osilia), Läänemaa (Rotalia or Maritima), Harjumaa (Harria), Rävala (Revalia), Virumaa (Vironia), Järvamaa (Jervia), Sakala (Saccala), and Ugandi (Ugaunia).

County Government
The County Government (Estonian: Maavalitsus) is led by Governor (Estonian: maavanem), who is appointed by the Government of Estonia for a term of five years. Currently the Governor position is held by Alo Aasma.

Municipalities
The county is subdivided into municipalities. There are two rural municipalities (Estonian: vallad – parishes) and one urban municipality (Estonian: linnad – towns) in Järva County. There are 217 villages in Järvamaa.

Religion

Images

References

External links

Järvamaa Tourist Information

 
Counties of Estonia